Hailey Esther Kops (born June 1, 2002) is an American-born Israeli pair skater. With former partner Evgeni Krasnopolski, she competed for Israel at the 2022 Winter Olympics.

With her former partner, Artem Tsoglin, she competed in the final segment at two World Junior Figure Skating Championships (2017 and 2018).

Personal life 
Kops was born in New York City, New York, and later lived in West Orange, New Jersey. Her parents are Lisa and Steven Kops. She has four brothers Corey, Max, Evan, and Ty. Max played for an Israeli team called Maccabiah. her little brothers Evan and Ty play for an academy for PSA. She is an Orthodox Jew. Her older brother Corey plays ice hockey, in 2015-16, played for the	Raanana Hitman of the Israeli League, and in 2017 played for the Kalkaska Rhinos in the United States Premier Hockey League in Michigan.

In high school, she was home-schooled. After graduating from high school, she spent a gap year studying at the Orthodox Jewish Midreshet Amit Seminary in Jerusalem, Israel, in 2020-21.

Career 
Kops began learning to skate in 2004. In 2016, she teamed up with Artem Tsoglin to compete for Israel in pair skating. The two made their international debut in September 2016, placing 9th at the ISU Junior Grand Prix in Russia. In March, the pair finished 11th at the 2017 World Junior Championships in Taipei, Taiwan.

Kops/Tsoglin placed 16th at the 2018 World Junior Championships in Sofia, Bulgaria. They were named to Israel's team for the 2019 European Figure Skating Championships in Minsk, Belarus.

After the end of her partnership with Tsoglin, Kops took some time away from the sport. She announced in the summer of 2021 that she had formed a new partnership with Evgeni Krasnopolski. After three months' preparation, they competed at the 2021 CS Nebelhorn Trophy to attempt to qualify a berth for Israel at the 2022 Winter Olympics. Seventh in the short program, they were fourth in the free skate and rose to fifth overall, sufficient to qualify for the third of three available pairs spots. Kops/Krasnopolski qualified for the free skate in the pairs event, finishing fifteenth overall.

Programs

With Krasnopolski

With Tsoglin

Competitive highlights 
CS: Challenger Series; JGP: Junior Grand Prix

Pairs with Krasnopolski

Pairs with Tsoglin

Ladies' singles

References

External links 
 
 
 
 

2002 births
Israeli female pair skaters
Israeli Orthodox Jews
Living people
Sportspeople from New York City
Jewish American sportspeople
Jewish Israeli sportspeople
People from West Orange, New Jersey
Sportspeople from Essex County, New Jersey
Sportspeople from Hackensack, New Jersey
21st-century American Jews
Figure skaters at the 2022 Winter Olympics
Olympic figure skaters of Israel
American people of Israeli descent